Thomas Neville Bonner (28 May 1923 – 2 September 2003) was professor emeritus at Wayne State University and a leading historian of medicine.  Bonner was the twelfth President of the University of New Hampshire from 1971 to 1974.  After 3 years at UNH he became the fifteenth president of Union College from 1974 to 1978. He then became the seventh president of Wayne State University from 1978 to 1982.  Bonner was a U.S. Army World War II veteran as part of the  Army Signal Intelligence Unit in Europe. He is buried at the National Memorial Cemetery of Arizona in Phoenix, Arizona.

Selected publications
 Iconoclast: Abraham Flexner and a Life in Learning
 To the Ends of the Earth: Women's Search for Education in Medicine
 Becoming a Physician: Medical Education in Britain, France, Germany, and the United States, 1750–1945
 Medicine in Chicago, 1850–1950: A Chapter in the Social and Scientific Development of a City
 American Doctors and German Universities: A Chapter in Intellectual Relations, 1870–1914
 The Kansas doctor: A century of pioneering
 Our Recent Past
 The contemporary world: The social sciences in historical perspective

References

External links 
 University of New Hampshire: Office of the President
 Full list of University Presidents (including interim Presidents) , University of New Hampshire Library
 

1923 births
2003 deaths
Wayne State University faculty
Northwestern University alumni
American medical historians
Presidents of Union College (New York)
Presidents of the University of New Hampshire
Presidents of Wayne State University
United States Army personnel of World War II
Burials in Arizona
20th-century American academics